Billy Dilley's Super-Duper Subterranean Summer is an American animated television series created by Aaron Springer.  The series lasted for one season and aired on Disney XD from June 3 to June 15, 2017.

Plot
The show follows the adventures of Billy Dilley (Aaron Springer), a 7th grader who loves science, and his lab partners, Zeke (Tom Kenny) and Marsha (Catherine Wayne), and his pet rat, Anaximander, who on summer vacation find themselves trapped in Subterranea-Tania, a strange world located in the Earth's core after a test ride in Billy's science fair project The Cheeserator, a giant drilling machine designed for cutting holes in enormous Swiss cheese, goes horribly wrong.

Characters
Billy Dilley (voiced by Aaron Springer) – An eccentric science-obsessed boy, who is more observant and often willing to explore much of the creatures in Subterranea-Tania. He at times is often described as silly, weird, trouble-prone, and optimistic at times.
Zeke (voiced by Tom Kenny) – A long-haired, preteen slacker who was assigned to work with Billy. He often tries to appear cool and aloof, but in reality, get emotional quite easily. He is considered the voice of reason and usually makes sarcastic remarks. Zeke also tends to be a talented chef, often making Calzones and Pancakes.
Marsha (voiced by Catherine Wayne) – A wannabe social butterfly and budding journalist who was assigned to work with Billy. She is very impressionable and lively, if somewhat spacey at times.
Anaximander – Billy's silent pet rat who spends much of the episodes lazing around.
Judy (voiced by Sarah-Nicole Robles) – A cute female swamp creature that Billy befriends, and later becomes his love interest. She appears in the episode “Hey Judy” and also made some small appearances in “The Mushroom Prince”, “Rat’s Entertainment”, and “The Battle for Subterranea-Tania”.
Count Raymond Wretcher (voiced by James Arnold Taylor) – A self-proclaimed tyrant from Subterranea-Tania, who dreams of covering the surface world with sludge. He pretends to be friendly towards Billy as an attempt to steal the Cheeserator to bring up to the surface.
Mrs. Wretcher (voiced by Kerri Kenney-Silver) – Count Wretcher's overbearing mother, who often complains to her son about spreading sludge outside the castle grounds. She is never physically seen as she only appears as a portrait with a speaker below to communicate with others.
Big Doug (voiced by Brian Doyle-Murray) – The one-eyed mammoth farmer and owner of “Big Doug’s Wonderful World of Wigs”. He made his first appearance in “Ol' MacBilly” and had some small appearances in “Rat’s Entertainment” and “The Battle for Subterranea-Tania”.
Hag Witch (voiced by Susanne Blakeslee) – An elderly sorceress who has a massive crush on Count Wretcher. Billy works for her as her apprentice.
The Troggies – Primitive ape-like creatures in Subterranea-Tania. 
Yucky (voiced by Richard Steven Horvitz) – A young Troggie who is friends with Billy. His vocabulary consists almost entirely of his own name. While he can be naive and mischievous, Yucky tends to be very intelligent. 
Tony (voiced by Kenny Pittenger) – A snail-like creature who was formerly an apprentice to the Hag Witch and a friend to Billy.
The Gorks – A tribe of lizard warriors who have a hatred for surface-dwellers. In “Lab Friends… Forever?”, they were convinced that Billy, Zeke, and Marsha were the ultra-rare Wormasaurus Rex.
Gorkager (voiced by Brian Posehn) – The wise leader of the Gorks. While he is intelligent, he tends to be aggressive at times.
Chancellor Gork (voiced by Aaron Springer) – The second-in-command to Gorkager. He only appears in the first episode, mistaking Billy for an entertainer.
The Great Gork in the Celing (voiced by Kevin Michael Richardson) – The old Gork god who lives in the clouds of Subterranea-Tania.
Gregory P. Zartran (voiced by Travis Willingham) – A golden-haired barbarian who is actually a homeless conman desperately trying to look for a good home and food.
Francis (aka Gumbrump) (voiced by Kevin Michael Richardson) – A brownish-red cyclops creature who is said to be Zartran's arch-enemy, but is actually his best buddy. He regularly speaks in a wimpy nasally voice, though whenever he goes in character as the Gumbrump, he speaks in a deep, growly voice.
Thurston (voiced by Tom Kenny) – The servant to Count Wretcher and Mrs. Wretcher. He doesn't seem to have much of a personality.
The Orangutanasaurs – Orangutan-like creatures who are similar to the Troggies, but they speak better English.
The Mushroom Prince (voiced by Aaron Springer) – The ruler of Subterranea-Tania's mushroom patch. He appears in the episode “The Mushroom Prince”.
Aunt Agnes (voiced by Mary Jo Catlett) – An elderly lizard woman who is secretly a member of the Subterranea-Tania police. She appears in the episode “Billy/Willie”.
Mr. Ogre Chef (voiced by Fred Tatasciore) – A large pink ogre who lives in a cave. He appears in the episode “Calzones”.
Hag Sisters (voiced by Tom Kenny and Catie Wayne) – The Hag Witch's two sisters who are said to be beauticians. They appear in the episode “Silly Spheres”.
Jared (voiced by Andy Milonakis) – A tentacled jellyfish-like monster who is a hideous flesh-eater. He appears in the episode “Jared”, where he suffers from amnesia and befriends Zeke and Marsha. 
Sluggy (vocal effects by Fred Tatasciore) – A slug who Billy befriends as a pet after feeling ignored by Anaximander. He appears in the episode "Sluggy".
Mud Men – Gross, slimy creatures who live in Subterranea-Tania. In “The Date”, Billy and Zeke disguised a Mud Man as Marsha's summer love, Greg Hastings.

Production
The show was first announced in 2014 as a potential pilot. In March 2016, it was confirmed that Disney XD has greenlit the show for a full series along with Big City Greens.

In 2015, Merriwether Williams was confirmed in a Twitter post by Vincent Waller as one of the show's writers, whilst Character designer Robertryan Cory announced on his Tumblr page he has been working on the series since December 2014, just over a year before the pickup was officially announced.

Jessica McKenna was originally chosen to be the voice of Billy Dilley. However, creator Aaron Springer was ultimately chosen in that role.

Episodes
The series consists of 13 half-hour episodes, with most of them containing 2 11-minute segments with the final episode being a full-length episode.

Broadcast
Billy Dilley's Super-Duper Subterranean Summer premiered on Disney XD in Canada on June 5, in Germany, Disney XD premiered the series on July 7, in Australia and New Zealand, the series premiered on Disney XD in October 2017, in the United Kingdom and Ireland, the show premiered on Disney XD on September 18, 2017.

Reception
Emily Ashby of Common Sense Media gave the series 3 out of 5 stars; saying “This new world of Billy's appeals to kids' sense of imagination, even if it does so with more nonsense than anything else. The show is visually pleasing, boasts a talented voice cast, and is filled with nonstop action and laughs.”

References

External links
 

2010s American animated television series
2017 American television series debuts
2017 animated television series debuts
2017 American television series endings
Television series by Disney Television Animation
Television series by Rough Draft Studios
Disney XD original programming
English-language television shows
American children's animated adventure television series
American children's animated comedy television series
Subterranean fiction
Animated television series about children
Television series about vacationing